Pradyum Reddy (born 31 May 1976) is a Scottish football manager based in India. He is now a football pundit in the Indian Super League and TV show Football United.

Coaching career

2011–2012: Shillong Lajong 
In 2011, Reddy helped Shillong Lajong to promotion to the I-League by winning the I-League 2nd Division. After successfully keeping the team in the I-League in 2011–12 I-League season, Reddy was moved to the role of Technical Director of the club's Youth Development team. Reddy later resigned due to contractual disputes with the club.

2013: DSK Shivajians
After leaving Shillong Lajong, Reddy signed for DSK Shivajians F.C. in the I-League 2nd Division.

2013: Assistant with Bengaluru
On 25 June 2013, it was confirmed that Reddy had left DSK and signed with Bengaluru FC of the I-League as the assistant coach.

Pune City 
In 2017, Reddy moved to FC Pune City in the role of assistant coach for their 2017–18 season.

During the 2018–19 season, he was appointed at the Technical Director at the club. However, just three matches into the season, Reddy was appointed at the interim coach of the club, following the sacking of manager Miguel Ángel Portugal on 26 October 2018. He stayed in the role until the 24 December 2018 when Pune City appointed Phil Brown as their new head coach.

Statistics

Managerial statistics
.

References

1976 births
Living people
Sportspeople from Dumfries
Scottish footballers
Scottish football managers
Shillong Lajong FC managers
DSK Shivajians FC managers
FC Pune City managers
Indian Super League head coaches
Association footballers not categorized by position
Scottish expatriate football managers
Scottish people of Indian descent
British sportspeople of Indian descent